WEP may stand for:
 Abbreviation of weapon
 War emergency power, an engine mode for military aircraft
 Weak equivalence principle, in relativity theory
 West European Politics, a journal of comparative politics
 Wetland Park stop, MTR station code
  the pen name of Australian cartoonist William Edwin Pidgeon (1909–1981)
 Windfall Elimination Provision, a statutory provision of the U.S. Social Security system
 Windows Entertainment Pack, alternate name for Microsoft Entertainment Pack, a computer game collection 
 Wired Equivalent Privacy (WEP), a wireless network security standard (sometimes mistakenly referred to as "Wireless Encryption Protocol")
 Words of Estimative Probability, terms used by intelligence analysts to convey the likelihood of a future event
 Women's Equality Party, political party in the United Kingdom
 Women's Equality Party (New York), political party in the United States
 World Events Productions, an American animation and distribution company
 Wisconsin Experiment Package, an instrument aboard the space telescope Orbiting Astronomical Observatory 2
 Wonder Egg Priority, a Japanese anime series
 Microsoft Entertainment Pack, also known as Windows Entertainment Pack or Simply WEP, a collection of 16-bit casual computer games for Windows published by  Microsoft in early 1990s.